Saúl López Sollano is a Mexican academic and politician affiliated with the National Regeneration Movement. From April 28, 2005 to August 31, 2006, he served as a senator in the LIX Legislature of the Mexican Congress representing Guerrero as the alternate to Armando Chavarría Barrera.
In 2017, he left the Party of the Democratic Revolution and joined Morena.

References

Date of birth unknown
Living people
Politicians from Guerrero
Members of the Senate of the Republic (Mexico)
Morena (political party) politicians
Year of birth missing (living people)
Members of the Congress of Guerrero
20th-century Mexican politicians
21st-century Mexican politicians